Yohana Nkunzumwami was an Anglican bishop in Burundi. He was married to Myriam Basabakwinshi and they had 12 children.
Myriam Was a fervent member of Mother’s Union till her death in June 2001.

Nkunzumwami was educated at Warner Memorial Theological College, Ibuye, Burundi and ordained deacon in 1956 and priest in 1957. He served the church in Uganda, Rwanda and Burundi. He was consecrated the first Bishop of Burundi in 1965.

References

Burundian Anglicans
20th-century Anglican bishops in Africa
Anglican bishops of Buye